The Seine River is a tributary of the Red River of the North that runs through southeastern Manitoba, Canada. It is one of the four rivers of the city of Winnipeg.

Its name comes from the Aboriginal word Tchimâhâgânisipi from Tchimâhâgân (meaning draw net or seine net) and sipi (river). The river rises in the Sandilands Provincial Forest near Steinbach and passes by or through the communities of Marchand, La Broquerie, Ste. Anne, and Lorette before reaching the Red River Floodway near the Winnipeg city limits. During a wet spring, the river often overflows its banks, sometimes flooding nearby houses. During a dry summer, the river is often reduced to a trickle.

Within the city, the Seine travels a tortuously meandering course, reaching the Red River at St. Boniface just north of The Forks. The lower section of its course in the city marks the east–west boundary between the southern section of St. Boniface and the suburb of St. Vital.
It is a typical meandering river with a single main channel embanked within a flat, shallow valley. The river's banks are heavily treed, but pollution has been an issue in the city of Winnipeg.

See also
List of rivers of Manitoba

References

External links

 Save Our Seine Environment Inc.
 Rivière Seine. Ressources naturelles Canada (fr). Retrieved 6 January 2017.
Rivers of Manitoba
Tributaries of the Red River of the North

Bodies of water of Eastman Region, Manitoba